Saint Henri Square, known officially as Saint Henri Park) is a town square in Montreal, Quebec, Canada. It is centrally located in the Saint Henri neighbourhood of the Le Sud-Ouest borough. The square is bordered by Saint Antoine Street West to the north, Agnes Street to the west, Place Guay to the south and Laporte Avenue to the east.

In 1890, the former city of Saint Henri acquired some land adjacent to Saint Antoine Street to create a small public park. It would become the first public park in Saint Henri.

The square is surrounded by Victorian row houses and triplexes which were built for members of the local elite.

Jacques Cartier Monument

A commission for a monument to the French explorer Jacques Cartier was made shortly thereafter to Quebec sculptor Joseph-Arthur Vincent. In 1893, this statue was installed and unveiled in the centre of the square.

In the 1990s, the Cartier statue was replaced with a replica because the original had deteriorated due to exposure. In 1992, working from both original and archival photographs, sculptor Jules Lasalle produced a faithful copy. The original statue was then relocated to the Place Saint Henri metro station.

References

Squares in Montreal
Le Sud-Ouest
Outdoor sculptures in Montreal